Semigallian may refer to:
Semigallians, a Baltic tribe
Semigallian language, an extinct Baltic language
Zemgale, a region in Latvia

Language and nationality disambiguation pages